Atipamezole (brand name Antisedan, also available in generic forms as Revertidine, is a synthetic α2 adrenergic receptor antagonist indicated for the reversal of the sedative and analgesic effects of dexmedetomidine and medetomidine in dogs. Its reversal effect works by competing with the sedative for α2-adrenergic receptors and displacing them. It is mainly used in veterinary medicine, and while it is only licensed for dogs and for intramuscular use, it has been used intravenously, as well as in cats and other animals. There is a low rate of side effects, largely due to atipamezole's high specificity for the α2-adrenergic receptor. Atipamezole  has a very quick onset, usually waking an animal up within 5 to 10 minutes.

It was originally released in 1996 and is sold in the U.S. by Zoetis.

Medical uses 
Atipamezole is a veterinary drug whose prime purpose is to reverse the effects of the sedative dexmedetomidine (as well as its racemic mixture, medetomidine). It can also be used to reverse the related sedative xylazine. While it reverses both the sedative and analgesic (pain-relieving) effects of dexmedetomidine, atipamezole may not entirely reverse the cardiovascular depression that dexmedetomidine causes.

Atipamezole is licensed in the United States for intramuscular injection (IM) in dogs; it is, however, used off-label in cats, rabbits, and farm animals such as horses and cows, as well as in zoo medicine for reptiles (including tortoises, turtles, and alligators), armadillos, hippopotamuses, giraffes, okapi, and others. It has been given intravenously (IV), subcutaneously, intraperitoneally and, in red-eared sliders, intranasally. IV administration is recommended in emergencies.

Atipamezole has also been used as an antidote for various toxicities in dogs. For example, the anti-tick medication amitraz is commonly ingested by dogs who eat their anti-tick collars. Amitraz works by the same mechanism as dexmedetomidine and is thus easily reversed by atipamezole. Atipamezole also reverses the hypotension caused by tizanidine (a muscle relaxant) toxicity, and relieves toxicity from decongestants such as ephedrine and pseudoephedrine.

Available forms 
Atipamezole is sold at 5 mg/mL for ease of use: 5 times as much atipamezole as medetomidine is needed for full reversal, and because medetomidine is sold as 1 mg/mL, 1 mL of atipamezole reverses 1 mL of medetomidine. When the enantiomerically pure version of medetomidine (dexmedetomidine) was released, it was sold at 0.5 mg/mL, because it was twice as strong as medetomidine. As such, 1 mL of atipamezole also reverses 1 mL of dexmedetomidine.

Specific populations
Atipamezole is not recommended for animals that are pregnant, lactating, or slated for breeding.

Contraindications 
While there are no absolute contraindications to atipamezole, it is recommended against being given with anticholinergics, as both can cause dramatic increases in heart rate. Atipamezole should also not be given too soon after an animal has been given dexmedetomidine mixed with ketamine or telazol(tiletamine); because it reverses only the dexmedetomidine, the ketamine or telazol will still be active, and the animal can wake up excited, delirious, and with muscle contractions. Some recommend not using it in dogs sedated with ketamine at all, since they can convulse due to the excitement effect.

Side effects 
Atipamezole's low rate of side effects is due to its high specificity for ɑ2-adrenergic receptors; it has very little affinity for ɑ1-adrenergic receptors and no affinity for most serotonin, muscarinic, and dopamine receptors. There is occasional vomiting, hypersalivation, and diarrhea. It can potentially cause CNS excitement, which can lead to tremors, tachycardia (increased heart rate), and vasodilation. The vasodilation leads to a transient decrease in blood pressure, which (in dogs) increases to normal within 10 minutes. There have been reports of transient hypoxemia. The chance of side effect can be minimized by administering atipamezole slowly.

There is a possibility of the sedation reversing abruptly, leading to nervous, aggressive, or delirious dogs. Such cases are more associated with IV administration (which has a faster onset than IM administration). The rapid administration of atipamezole leads to sudden displacement of dexmedetomidine from peripheral ɑ2-adrenergic receptors; this can cause a sudden drop in blood pressure, which is followed by a reflex tachycardia and hypertension.

There have been some cases where IV administration of atipamezole lead to death via cardiovascular collapse. This is thought to be combination of sudden hypotension added onto the low heart rate caused by sedatives.

There is some possibility of the animal relapsing into sedation after being given atipamezole, made more likely if the original sedative was given IV.

Rats and monkeys have experienced increased sexual activity after being given atipamezole.

Overdose 
The LD50 of atipamezole for rats is 44 mg/kg when given subcutaneously. The minimum lethal dose in dogs is over 5 mg/m2; dogs have tolerated getting ten times the standard dose. Signs of overdose include panting, trembling, vomiting, and diarrhea, as well as increased blood levels of creatinine kinase, aspartate transaminase, and alanine transaminase. Dogs who received atipamezole without first receiving dexmedotomidine have shown no clinical signs other than mild muscle tremors.

Pharmacology

Mechanism of action 
Atipamezole is a competitive antagonist at ɑ2-adrenergic receptors that competes with dexmedetomidine, an ɑ2-adrenergic receptors agonist. It does not directly interact with dexmedetomidine; rather, their structural similarity allows atipamezole to easily compete for receptor binding sites.

Atipamezole reverses analgesia by blocking norepinephrine feedback inhibition on nociceptors.

Pharmacokinetics 
Out of the three ɑ2-antagonists commonly used in veterinary medicine (atipamezole, yohimbine, and tolazine), atipamezole shows the highest preference for ɑ2- over ɑ1-receptors, binding to them with a ratio of 8526:1. It shows no preference for a particular ɑ2-receptor subtype.

Atipamezole has a rapid onset: it reverses the decreased heart rate caused by sedation within three minutes. The animal usually begins waking up within 5–10 minutes. In a study of over 100 dogs, more than half could stand up within 5 minutes, and 96% could stand up within 15. Atipamezole reaches maximum serum concentration within 10 minutes of IM administration. Atipamezole is distributed extensively to the tissues; at a particular time, concentrations in the brain reach two to three times the concentration in the plasma.

Atipamezole undergoes heavy first-pass metabolism in the liver, which includes the glucuronidation at nitrogen during. Metabolites are mostly excreted in the urine.

The elimination half-life is 2.6 hours in dogs and 1.3 hours rats.

Research 
Atipamezole's effects on cognitive function have been studied in rats and in humans. While low doses in rats improved alertness, selective attention, learning, and recall, higher doses generally impaired cognitive function (most likely due to norepinephrine overactivity). In rats, it has also been shown to improve cognitive function decreased by strokes or brain lesions. Studies in humans have found it to increase focus but decrease multitasking abilities. Atipamezole has also been researched in humans as a potential anti-Parkinsonian.

Because atipamezole increases sexual activity in monkeys, there have been claims of its potential to treat erectile dysfunction.

See also 
Detomidine
Flumazenil
Naloxone

Notes

References

Further reading

External links

 of Antisedan.

Veterinary drugs
Imidazoles
Indanes
Antidotes
Alpha-2 blockers